Crazy Eddie's GUI (CEGUI) is a graphical user interface (GUI) library for the programming language C++. It was designed for the needs of video games, but is usable for non-game tasks, such as applications and tools. It is designed for user flexibility in look-and-feel, and to be adaptable to the user's choice in tools and operating systems.

Configurability
The strengths CEGUI are its robustness and its configurability. The system does not directly load files, render windows, directly display text, or even fetch input from the system. CEGUI interfaces with these through user-defined code, though its source code package comes with a number of modules for using certain components and libraries.

This freedom allows using CEGUI in any kind of resource management system or operating environment. Input is expected to be gathered by the user's code, possibly filtered as the user sees fit, and then passed to CEGUI for window processing.

CEGUI comes with a reasonable set of widgets, comparable to those of the average widget toolkit.

Tools
CEGUI can be fully customized using standard image, xml, and/or code editing tools. However, CEGUI also provides tools designed to aid in designing and developing CEGUI based interfaces.

Older CEGUI versions, before 0.8, provided separate tools to edit different aspects of the interface. The most notable of those being the Imageset and Layout editors.

Since CEGUI 0.8, there exists a new unified editing tool called CEGUI unified editor (CEED) which is being actively developed. It incorporates all aspects of GUI development into one tool.

Rendering
Rendering is performed by a back-end Rendering Module. CEGUI provides modules for Direct3D, OpenGL, the OGRE 3D engine, and the Irrlicht Engine. Other modules can be written for custom engines.

CEGUI's GUI components are organized in a tree (graph) and are rendered in the order of the tree traversal.

Resource management
File loading and resource management are handled through a back-end "Resource Provider Module". Users can create custom modules to define how resources are accessed. This allows the library to be used in virtually any operating environment. The default resource provider is cross-platform and provides standard file-access mechanics for loading resources. An optional minizip module enables resource-loading from zip-archives.

Memory management
CEGUI has a flexible Memory Management system. This system was based on OGRE and allows clients to map different types of allocators to different types of objects. By default all objects use the operating system's default allocator. CEGUI provides support for OGRE and nedmalloc allocators.

Scripting
CEGUI has an optional back-end Scripting Module. Lua and Python scripting modules are provided by CEGUI. The full CEGUI application programming interface (API) is available via script so that clients can create windows, define relationships, and handle events all within a scripted environment.

Look and feel
CEGUI has a powerful system for defining the look and feel of various widgets. The system, named Falagard, allows defining the look of a widget via XML files, or C++ code, if the user prefers. It can also change the layout behavior of any widgets.

Animation
CEGUI has a built-in animation system. This system allows many standard transitional effects from moving and resizing windows to color transforms and image sequencing. Animations can be defined in XML and triggered by any event. The client can specify window-properties as key-frames, how to transition between frames, and the transition-time between frames.

Unicode
CEGUI is Unicode-aware and has support for bi-directional languages via an optional back-end Bidi Module. This support is provided by MiniBidi or FriBidi.

Library dependencies
CEGUI can be built with no dependencies to outside libraries. However, typical configurations require FreeType, a rendering module, an XML parser module, and an image codec module. CEGUI already provides support for several external libraries thanks to its modular design:

The Ogre3D library used to depend on the CEGUI library for its UI but Ogre3D has since changed to include its own UI solution, which is slimmer but also provides less functionality.

Release history

See also
 List of widget toolkits
 List of platform-independent GUI libraries

References

External links
 

Application programming interfaces
Cross-platform software
Free computer libraries
Graphical user interfaces
Lua (programming language)-scriptable software
Software using the MIT license
Widget toolkits